Borislav Penchov Ivanov is Bulgaria's most succestul athlete in Olympic karate and currently a karate coach.

Biography 
Borislav Ivanov was born on 18 January 1977 in Kyustendil, Bulgaria. He started his training career at the age of fourteen in his local karate klub "Pautalyia". In 1992 he entered his first ever competition and won first place at Bulgaria's national championship. In 1999 Ivanov graduated from the National Sports Academy with a degree in coaching.

Career 
Ivanov is the most successful Bulgarian competitor in Olympic karate. During his career he has won four bronze medals from European championship and one bronze medal from the World championship for youths. He is the only Bulgarian to win any kind of medal in men's karate. His last ever competition is his appearance in the 2016 Karate world championship in Linz, Austria.  Borislav Ivanov has also coached the Bulgarian national from 2000 to 2008. He founded his own Karate Club "Daris" with training facilities in Kystendil and Sofia, where he is chairman and head trainer.

Achievements 
   3rd Place – World Championship – youths – kumite – 60 kg in Sofia, Bulgaria – 1999
   3rd Place European Championship – men – kumite – 60 kg in Halhidiki, Greece – 1999
   3rd Place European Championship – men – kumite – 60 kg in Tallinn, Estonia – 2002
   3rd Place European Championship – men – kumite – 60 kg in Moscow, Russia – 2004
   3rd Place European Championship – men – kumite – 60 kg in Bratislava, Slovakia – 2007
   8 time Balkan Karate Champion
   Multiple Bulgarian champion

References 

Bulgarian male karateka
1977 births
Living people
People from Kyustendil
Sportspeople from Kyustendil Province